The Higher Technological Institute of Irapuato (In Spanish: Instituto Tecnológico Superior de Irapuato), popularly known as ITESI, is a public, coeducational university located in the city of Irapuato, Guanajuato, Mexico.

The ITESI offers 17 bachelor's degrees and 4 masters programs in the areas of management and social sciences and engineering.  By October 20, 1995, the state government of Guanajuato decreed the creation of ITESI; and the latter began its academic activities on August 18, 1996.

External links

References

Universities and colleges in Guanajuato
Irapuato